Contract killing is a form of murder or assassination in which one party hires another party to kill a targeted person or persons. It involves an illegal agreement which includes some form of payment, monetary or otherwise. Either party may be a person, group, or organization. Contract killing has been associated with organized crime, government conspiracies, dictatorships, and vendettas. For example, in the United States, the Italian- and Jewish-American organized crime gang Murder, Inc. committed hundreds of murders on behalf of the National Crime Syndicate during the 1930s and '40s.

Contract killing provides the hiring party with the advantage of not having to carry out the actual killing, making it more difficult for law enforcement to connect the hirer with the murder. The likelihood that authorities will establish that party's guilt for the committed crime, especially due to lack of forensic evidence linked to the contracting party, makes the case more difficult to attribute to the hiring party. Contract killers may exhibit serial killer traits, but are generally not classified as such because of third-party killing objectives and detached financial and emotional incentives. Nevertheless, there are occasionally individuals that are labeled as both contract killers and serial killers.

A contract killer is colloquially known as a hitman. Contract killers who work for criminal organizations are often known as enforcers.

Statistics
A study by the Australian Institute of Criminology of 162 contract murders and attempted contract murders in Australia between 1989 and 2002 indicated that the most common reason for murder-for-hire was insurance policy payouts. The study also found that payments varied from $5,000 to $30,000 per killing, with an average of $15,000, and that the most commonly used weapons were firearms. Contract killings accounted for 2% of murders in Australia during that time period.
Contract killings generally make up a small percentage of murders. For example, they accounted for about 5% of all murders in Scotland from 1993 to 2002.

Notable persons

Perpetrators

 Vincent "Mad Dog" Coll, an Irish-American hitman from Gweedore, County Donegal, who worked for Salvatore Maranzano, Dutch Schultz, and Owney Madden.
 Elmer "Trigger" Burke, notorious hitman and supporting player in the Great Brink's Robbery
 Maia "Mainha" Cunha, a notorious Brazilian hitman, he is considered the biggest hitman in Northeast Brazil and his targets were usually northeastern politicians, mostly mayors of cities in the interior of northeastern Brazil.
 Glennon Engleman, American dentist who moonlighted as a hitman.
 Ray Ferritto, Italian-American hitman and soldier for the Cleveland and Los Angeles crime families, best known for the October 1977 car bombing murder of Irish mob boss Danny Greene in Lyndhurst, Ohio; later Ferritto became a government witness and testified against the mob.
 Christopher Dale Flannery, reputed Australian hitman.
 El Chino Ántrax, a notorious Mexican drug lord and hitman, he was a high-ranking member of Sinaloa Cartel and the leader of Los Antrax, a feared hitman squad and an armed wing of the Sinaloa Cartel.
 Giuseppe Greco, a Sicilian hitman who killed at least 58 people during the Second Mafia War.
 Charles Harrelson, American hitman, father of actor Woody Harrelson.
 Patrick Holland, Irish alleged hitman for the Dublin-based drug trafficking ring led by John Gilligan and John Traynor. Accused by Irish law enforcement of having been responsible for the 1996 murder of investigative journalist Veronica Guerin.
 Richard Kuklinski, an alleged hitman for the DeCavalcante crime family and the Five Families who claimed responsibility for more than 200 murders.
 Marinko Magda, Serbian hitman convicted for 11 murders.
 Tommy "Karate" Pitera, an Italian-American hitman and soldier in the Bonanno crime family. He was known for having serial killer-like characteristics, and was a skilled martial artist.
 Alexander "Sasha-Soldier" Pustovalov, Russian Mafia hitman and Orekhovskaya gang soldier. Pustovalov has 22 confirmed kills.
 Abe Reles, hitman and initial leader of Murder, Inc. along with Martin Goldstein. 
 Julio Santana, a notorious Brazilian hitman, he is considered by the Brazilian and international media as "the deadliest hitman in history", for having killed 492 people officially (more than 500 unofficially), considered the highest number of fatal victims killed by a single hitman.
 Frank "the Irishman" Sheeran, a union official and mob hitman, who was associated with Russell Bufalino. Sheeran claimed to have murdered former Teamsters president Jimmy Hoffa.
 Benjamin "Bugsy" Siegel, a Jewish hitman who headed the Bugs and Meyer Mob and was a hitman for Murder, Inc.; Siegel was also the Italian mob's main hitman during Prohibition.
 Alexander Solonik, Russian hitman, known for carrying a firearm in each hand. Alexander Solonik was a main killer in the Kurganskaya criminal group.
 Harry Strauss, hitman for Murder, Inc. he is possibly the most prolific hitman to have ever lived, committing 100 (possibly 500) murders during his career.
 Jhon Jairo "Popeye" Velásquez, Colombian hitman who was part of the Medellín Cartel.
 Ilpo Larha, Finnish criminal who also became Finland's first hitman in 1992
 Robert Young,  Willie Sanchez, an escaped convict and contract killer employed by an African-American organized crime gang headed by Nicky Barnes.
 Z, a 15-year-old minor who was convicted of murdering an insurance agent under the orders of her husband in Singapore in 2001. He was detained at the President's Pleasure for 17 years.

Victims 
 Griselda Blanco, the subject of the film Cocaine Godmother (2018), a former drug lord gunned down on September 3, 2012.
 Harry Greenberg, a Mafia associate of Charles "Lucky" Luciano, Meyer Lansky, and Benjamin "Bugsy" Siegel. He was killed by Siegel, Whitey Krakower, Albert Tannenbaum, and Frankie Carbo in 1939.
 Danny Hogan, an Irish mob boss based in the Twin Cities, whose 1928 assassination, allegedly by disgruntled associate Harry Sawyer is believed to be the first murder by car bombing in the history of American organized crime.
 Annie Leong, an insurance agent in Singapore who was murdered by a minor hired by her husband, who was subsequently sentenced to death and later executed.
 Walter Liggett, an investigative journalist specializing in exposes of collusion between Depression era organized crime in the Twin Cities and senior politicians from Minnesota's ruling Farmer-Labor Party. Assassinated before his wife and children in December 1935, allegedly by Kid Cann, an enforcer for a Minneapolis-based Jewish-American organized crime gang called the "AZ Syndicate".
 Li Fuguo, a Tang dynasty eunuch killed by a hitman hired by Emperor Tang Daizong.
 Salvatore Maranzano,  a Castellammarese Mafia boss and rival to Masseria in the Castellammarese War who was killed by Siegel and several other men in 1931.
 Dan Markel, an attorney and legal academic murdered in Tallahassee, Florida, in 2014.
 Joe Masseria, a Mafia boss murdered by Siegel, Vito Genovese, Albert Anastasia, and Joe Adonis in 1931.
 Harry Millman, gang leader and former Purple Gang member, killed by Harry Strauss and Harry Maione.
 Nativo da Natividade, a well-known union leader from the Center-West of Brazil (who was originally a rural worker), he was one of the 492 people who were killed by the notorious Brazilian hitman Julio Santana. 
 Dion O'Banion, Irish mob boss of Chicago's North Side Gang, whose 1924 assassination by Frankie Yale, John Scalise, and Albert Anselmi touched off almost a decade of gangland warfare. 
 Maria Lúcia Petit, a teacher, far-left militant and communist guerrilla, was a member of the Communist Party of Brazil (PCdoB) and the Guerrilha do Araguaia. She was one of the 492 people who were killed by the notorious Brazilian hitman Julio Santana (as well as Nativo da Natividade).
 Shiori Ino, a 21-year-old university student, who was stabbed to death in 1999. Hitman had been hired by Ino's abusive ex-boyfriend (who committed suicide before he could be apprehended) and the ex-boyfriend's brother, who was sentenced to life imprisonment.
 Alexander Solonik, was strangled to death by Russian hitman and ex-Marine Alexander Pustovalov in his villa in 1997.
 Benjamin "Bugsy" Siegel, Las Vegas mob boss killed by unknown assailants in 1947.
 Barry Seal, American airline pilot and undercover CIA informer, who became a major drug smuggler for the Medellín Cartel.
 Brian Stidham, a pediatric ophthalmologist who was killed in a murder-for-hire plot by his colleague, Dr. Bradley Schwartz.
 Grady Stiles, a freak show performer whose family hired a hitman to kill due to his abusiveness.
 John H. Wood Jr., an American Federal judge known as "Maximum John" for giving severe prison sentences for drug offenses, murdered by Charles Harrelson at the behest of Lebanese-American drug lord Jamiel Chagra.

Employers 
Dana Ewell, convicted of hiring his college roommate to murder Ewell's mother, father, and sister for the US$8,000,000 estate.
 John Gotti, Italian-American crime boss, hired hitmen to murder Paul Castellano outside of Sparks Steak House in December 1985.
 Robert Fratta, ex-police officer, hired two men to kill his wife.
 Lawrence Horn, record producer whose hiring of a hitman led to the case Rice v. Paladin Press
 Mike Danton, former NHL player, hired an undercover federal agent to kill his sports agent.
 Wanda Holloway hired a hitman to kill the mother of her daughter's cheerleading rival, inspiring a film.
Silas Jayne, Chicago-area stable owner, was convicted in 1973 of hiring hitmen to murder his half-brother George. 
 Tim Lambesis, heavy metal vocalist who attempted to hire an undercover police officer to murder his wife.
 Charlotte Karin Lindström, Swedish waitress/model who attempted to hire a hitman to kill persons testifying against her boyfriend in a drug trial in Australia.
 Charles "Lucky" Luciano, American Mafia and Luciano crime family boss. Ordered Siegel, Tannenbaum, Genovese, Buchalter, Carbo, and Krakower to murder Mustache Petes Joe Masseria and Sal Maranzano in 1931, and stool pigeon Harry Greenberg in 1939.
 Joseph Maldonado-Passage (better known by his stage name Joe Exotic), an American zoo owner who attempted to hire an undercover FBI agent to murder a rival, the CEO of Big Cat Rescue (with whom he had a long-running and public feud).
 Diana Lovejoy, a technical writer, and her gun instructor Weldon McDavid were convicted of conspiracy to commit murder of Lovejoy's husband in 2016.
 Jennifer Pan, a Vietnamese-Canadian woman who hired three men to stage a home invasion in order to assassinate her parents in retaliation for a decades of tiger parenting in 2010.
 Nicole Doucet Ryan attempted to hire an undercover Royal Canadian Mounted Police officer to kill her husband. After ruling that she could not use the defense of duress, the Supreme Court of Canada ordered she could not be retried.
Pamela Smart hired teenage lover Billy Flynn and his friends to murder her husband.
Thomas Bartlett Whitaker, an American man who hired people to attack his parents and brother in a home invasion in 2003.
 Anthony Ler, a Singaporean who hired a 15-year-old student in 2001 to murder his wife with promises of money and sex, as well as manipulation and death threats.

In popular culture
Fictional cases of contract killing or "hitmen" are depicted in a range of popular fiction genres in the 20th and 21st century, including comic books, films, and video games.

Contract killing is a core aspect of the video game franchise Hitman, wherein the player controls a hired hitman simply known as Agent 47. In the game Hotline Miami, the player controls a man who receives mysterious calls telling him to kill members of the Russian Mafia. 

The website RentAHitman.com is a satirical homepage for a fake contract killing agency. Its owner passes on details of those who try to use his services to law enforcement agencies.

Nothing Personal is a television documentary series that presents stories of contract killings.

See also 

Assassination
Assassination market
Cleaner (crime)
List of contract killers and hitmen
Mercenary
Murder, Inc.
Private military company
Wetwork

Notes

References

External links
Murder-for-Hire: Web Hits of a Deadly Kind (FBI)
 Satire Site Rent-A-Hitman—Has gun, will Gavel News story behind site and most-recent of several convicted Point-and-clickers (CNN-12-12-2021)

 

Gangland warfare tactics
Organized crime activity
Temporary employment
Killings by type
Illegal occupations
Speech crimes